Narmun may refer to:
 Narmun, Fars
 Narmun, Kohgiluyeh and Boyer-Ahmad